Palaeophragmodictya is an extinct genus of sponge-grade organisms from the Ediacaran Period.
Originally interpreted as a hexactinellid sponge, the organism also bears some coelomate characteristics, including bilateral symmetry.

Morphology
The organisms take the form of a rounded, dome-like bag, 7–68 mm in diameter, with an uneven margin.  Radial grooves define sac-like compartments within the bag. The radial pattern has an element of bilateral symmetry. A stalk emerges from the central point of some specimens, at the top of the organism; in life, it probably extended into the water column.  Ray-like filaments radiate outwards from the edge of the bag.  Some structures in the organism have been interpreted as spicules.

Ecology
The organisms have been interpreted as tall suspension feeders, reaching 10 cm or more up into the sea water above them.

Original description

The genus was originally considered to be a member of the Dictyospongiidae family (hexactinellia), and was among the first Precambrian sponges to be described.

Distribution

First found in the Pound group of Australia, fossils have also been recovered from the White Sea region of Russia.

Other Sponge-Grade Ediacarans

Fedomia
Vaveliksia

See also

List of Ediacaran genera

References

Precambrian sponges
Ediacaran life
White Sea fossils
Prehistoric sponge genera
Fossils of Russia
Fossil taxa described in 1996